Syd "Professor" Reynolds was an offensive end in the Ontario Rugby Football Union.

A graduate of McMaster University, he joined the Toronto Balmy Beach Beachers in 1930, their last Grey Cup championship season. Over the next 9 years he was an all-star 5 times and won the Imperial Oil Trophy as MVP in the ORFU in 1936. He played 2 more seasons with the Beachers, 1940 and 1945.

References

McMaster Marauders football players
McMaster University alumni
Ontario Rugby Football Union players
Toronto Balmy Beach Beachers players
Year of birth missing
Year of death missing